Ain Kfar Zabad, or Aïn Kafar Zabad   is a city is situated  to the East of the Lebanese capital Beirut.

The river Bardaouni crosses the city.

External links
Ain Kfar Zabad, Localiban
  

Populated places in Zahlé District